Andrew John Maxton Cruickshank  (25 December 1907 in Aberdeen, Aberdeenshire29 April 1988 in London) was a Scottish actor, most famous for his portrayal of Dr Cameron in the long-running UK BBC television series Dr. Finlay's Casebook, which ran for 191 episodes from 1962 until 1971.

Life and career
Andrew Cruickshank (Junior) was born to Andrew and Annie Cruickshank (Cadger), and was educated at Aberdeen Grammar School. He was to have entered the profession of civil engineering after completing his education, but instead joined provincial repertory theatres, leading to 1930 roles in Othello at the Savoy Theatre in London, as Maudelyn in Richard of Bordeaux at the Empire Theatre on Broadway in 1934, and culminating in his principal appearance (as three characters) on the London stage in 1935, at the Gate Theatre in the play Victoria Regina.  In 1939 Cruickshank played Claudius in Tyrone Guthrie's modern-dress and uncut Hamlet at The Old Vic with Alec Guinness in the title role. He returned to Broadway in 1951 until 1952, as the Earl of Warwick in George Bernard Shaw's play Saint Joan, with Uta Hagen in the lead role.

His first film role followed in 1937, as the poet Robert Burns in Auld Lang Syne. Subsequently, however, he would be typecast into portrayals of formal authority figures, such as judges and doctors.

He appeared in many television plays and series, amongst them A. J. Cronin's Dr. Finlay's Casebook, containing his most famous characterisation, Doctor Angus Cameron, a crusty but erudite senior partner in the rural general practice run in Tannochbrae, with the help of the much younger Doctor Alan Finlay (Bill Simpson) and "stiff Presbyterian" housekeeper Janet (Barbara Mullen). The highly popular BBC production ran from 16 August 1962 until 3 January 1971, after which Cruickshank continued with it on BBC Radio 4 for seven years, it having been adapted to that format since 10 March 1970. He finally bade farewell to the character on 18 December 1978, following its parting episode, "Going Home". In 1963 he played the title role in the BBC sitcom Mr Justice Duncannon, having appeared as that character in the final episode of the 1962 sitcom Brothers in Law.

His final performance on the stage was as Justice Treadwell in Beyond Reasonable Doubt at the Queen's Theatre in 1987. His last appearance of any kind was at the age of 80, in the first episode ("Kicks") of series two of the ITV television production, King and Castle, which starred Nigel Planer and Derek Martin as partners in a debt collection agency, and in which Cruickshank played "Mr Hodinett". It was aired on 10 May 1988, just over a week after his death.

He was chair of the board of directors of Edinburgh Festival Fringe between 1970 and 1983.

He married Curigwen (née Lewis), and they had one son and two daughters.

Memorial
He has been immortalised in Milton Keynes, Buckinghamshire, by the naming of a road in his honour (Cruickshank Grove).

Partial filmography

 Auld Lang Syne (1937) – Robert Burns
 The Mark of Cain (1947) – Sir Jonathon Dockwra
 The Idol of Paris (1948) – Prince Nicholas
 Forbidden (1949) – Inspector Baxter
 Paper Orchid (1949) – Inspector Clement Pill
 Your Witness (1950) – Sir Adrian Horth K.C. – Prosecutor
 The Angel with the Trumpet (1950) – Otto Alt
 The Reluctant Widow (1950) – Lord Bedlington
 Where No Vultures Fly (1951) – Governor (uncredited)
 The Cruel Sea (1953) – Scott Brown
 John Wesley (1954) – Trustee of Georgia
 John and Julie (1955) – Uncle Ben
 Richard III (1955) – Brackenbury
 The Secret Tent (1956) – Detective Inspector Thornton
 The Battle of the River Plate (1956) – Captain Stubbs – 'Doric Star'
 The Story of Esther Costello (1957) – Dr. Stein
 Innocent Sinners (1958) – Dr. Lynch-Cliffe
 A Question of Adultery (1958) – Dr. Cameron
 Kidnapped (1959) – Colin Campbell
 The 39 Steps (1959) – Sheriff
 The Stranglers of Bombay (1960) – Colonel Henderson
 There Was a Crooked Man (1960) – McKillup
 Greyfriars Bobby: The True Story of a Dog (1961) – Lord Provost
 El Cid (1961) – Count Gormaz
 Live Now, Pay Later (1962) – Vicar
 We Joined the Navy (1962) – Admiral Filmer
 Come Fly with Me (1963) – Cardwell
 Murder Most Foul (1964) – Justice Crosby
 Wagner (1983) – Narrator
 The Body in the Library (1984) – Conway Jefferson

Publications
 Andrew Cruickshank: An Autobiography (1988) Weidenfeld & Nicolson, London.

References

External links

Memories of Andrew Cruickshank by Haldane Duncan, former Emmerdale director

Scottish male film actors
People from Aberdeen
Male actors from Aberdeen
1907 births
1988 deaths
Scottish male television actors
People educated at Aberdeen Grammar School
20th-century Scottish male actors
Edinburgh Festival Fringe staff
Members of the Order of the British Empire
Royal Welch Fusiliers officers
British Army personnel of World War II